The Forest Hills–71st Avenue station (previously known as 71st–Continental Avenues station) is an express station on the IND Queens Boulevard Line of the New York City Subway, located on Queens Boulevard at 71st (Continental) Avenue in Forest Hills, Queens. It serves as the terminus for the latter two services.

History

The Queens Boulevard Line was one of the first lines built by the city-owned Independent Subway System (IND), and stretches between the IND Eighth Avenue Line in Manhattan and 179th Street and Hillside Avenue in Jamaica, Queens. The Queens Boulevard Line was in part financed by a Public Works Administration (PWA) loan and grant of $25 million. One of the proposed stations would have been located at 71st Avenue. During the late 1920s, in anticipation of the arrival of the subway, land was bought by developers and was built up. Zoning laws were changed to allow fifteen-story apartment buildings to be built, and made the neighborhood of Forest Hills a more desirable place to live, especially as it was an express stop. Queens Borough President George Harvey predicted that the introduction of the subway to Forest Hills would turn Queens Boulevard into the "Park Avenue of Queens."

The station was proposed as a transfer station between the never-built Queens Super-Express Bypass as part of the 1968 Program for Action, which would have significantly expanded railway and subway service in the five boroughs. Under a 1984 plan, the new express station would have been one of three stops on the 63rd Street Line extension east of 21st Street–Queensbridge, the other two stops being at Northern Boulevard and Woodside. The bypass station would have had a mezzanine, two platform levels (an upper platform for Jamaica and Southeast Queens-bound trains; a lower platform for Manhattan-bound trains), a new elevator entrance, and an expanded mezzanine, with escalators and stairs connecting the new platform levels to the existing platforms. The new station would have been built on the south side of Queens Boulevard, south of the existing station.

In 2014, the Metropolitan Transportation Authority built a new signal tower for the Manhattan-bound platform. The agency also upgraded the station to compliance with the 1990 Americans With Disabilities Act; the upgrade included passenger elevators to serve the street level, mezzanine and platforms. This project was completed by March 2014 after a three-month delay. However, a ribbon-cutting for the new elevators was not held until May 15, 2014.

Station layout

The station has four tracks and two island platforms. It is the northern terminal for the local M and R trains, which stop on the outer tracks. To the east, the line widens to six tracks, with two tracks starting between the local and express tracks in each direction, then ramping down to a lower level, where they widen to four tracks and run under the 75th Avenue station to Jamaica Yard. F trains stop on the express track at all times, but switch to the local track to the east and continue on to Jamaica–179th Street. E trains stop on the express tracks at all times except late nights, when they make local stops along the Queens Boulevard Line. To the east, they continue on the express tracks (except evenings and weekends when they switch to the local track like the F) to Jamaica Center–Parsons/Archer, with limited rush-hour express service to 179th Street. This station has four punch boxes two at the eastern end and western end.

Both outer track walls have a light Fern green tile band with a black border and small "71st AVE" tile captions below them in white lettering on a black background. The station's I-beam columns are painted Emerald green with signs reading "71 - Forest Hills", while older signs on the black columns between the express tracks read "CONTINENTAL AVENUE - Forest Hills" in black lettering on a white background.

A signal tower and dispatchers' office is at the extreme western end of the southbound platform.

Exits
There are two fare control areas on the full width mezzanine above the platforms and tracks. The western section of the mezzanine is bounded on the west by the exit to the western side of 70th Road and the northern side of Queens Boulevard. There used to be a part-time booth at this location. On the east end, the fare control area is sided by a passageway out of fare control connecting the exits between 70th Road and 71st Avenue. There used to be a part-time booth at the northern section of the passageway. An elevator is located at the southern exit between 70th Road and 71st Avenue and makes the station ADA-accessible. The second fare control area is in between the aforementioned fare free passageway and the passageways connecting to the exits at 71st Avenue. At the eastern end of the mezzanine there is a staircase leading to Queens Boulevard between 71st Avenue and 71st Road on the northern side, and a staircase leading to the intersection of 71st Avenue and Queens Boulevard on the south side. There are seven staircases to each platform.

Signage
On the current MTA map and published timetables, the station name is "Forest Hills–71st Avenue." In the past, "Continental Avenue" (the alternative name of 71st Avenue used in nearby Forest Hills Gardens) has been included in the name and is used on the rollsigns of older rolling stock such as the R32. , the platform signage reads 71–Continental Av–Forest Hills.

Points of interest
Nearby points of interest include:
Austin Street, a major business thoroughfare in Forest Hills, located south of the station.
Forest Hills LIRR station, located in Station Square in Forest Hills Gardens at Burns Street.
Ridgewood Savings Bank, Forest Hills Branch, designated a landmark by the New York City Landmarks Preservation Commission since 2000.
West Side Tennis Club, containing Forest Hills Stadium, which hosted the US Open tennis tournament until 1977.

References

External links

 
 The Subway Nut — 71st Street–Continental Av–Forest Hills Pictures
 71st Avenue entrance from Google Maps Street View
 Entrance between 71st Avenue and 70th Road from Google Maps Street View
 70th Road entrance from Google Maps Street View
 Platforms from Google Maps Street View

IND Queens Boulevard Line stations
New York City Subway stations in Queens, New York
New York City Subway terminals
Railway stations in the United States opened in 1936
Forest Hills, Queens
1936 establishments in New York City